The 2014 women's road cycling season was the tenth for the Rabo–Liv Women Cycling Team, which began as DSB Bank in 2005.

Team roster

Ages as of 1 January 2014

Riders who joined the team for the 2014 season

Riders who left the team during or after the 2013 season

Season victories

Footnotes

References

2014 UCI Women's Teams seasons
2014 in Dutch sport
2014